Wyoming County is a county in the U.S. state of West Virginia.  As of the 2020 census, the population was 21,382. Its county seat is Pineville. The county was created in 1850 from Logan County and named for the Lenape word meaning "large plains".

Geography
The county is drained by the branches of Sandy and Guyandotte rivers. The land surface is mountainous.

In 1863, West Virginia's counties were divided into civil townships, with the intention of encouraging local government.  This proved impractical in the heavily rural state, and in 1872 the townships were converted into magisterial districts.  Wyoming County was divided into six districts: Barkers Ridge, Center, Clear Fork, Huff Creek, Oceana, and Slab Fork.  A seventh district, Baileysville, was created from portions of Clear Fork and Huff Creek in 1881.  Except for minor adjustments, the seven historic magisterial districts remained largely unchanged for over a century.  In the 1990s, they were consolidated into three new districts: District 1, District 2, and District 3.

Major highways

Adjacent counties
 Boone County (north)
 Raleigh County (northeast)
 Mercer County (southeast)
 McDowell County (south)
 Mingo County (west)
 Logan County (northwest)

Demographics

2000 census
As of the census of 2000, there were 25,709 people, 10,454 households, and 7,704 families living in the county.  The population density was 51 people per square mile (20/km2).  There were 11,698 housing units at an average density of 23 per square mile (9/km2).  The racial makeup of the county was 98.59% White, 0.63% Black or African American, 0.12% Native American, 0.08% Asian, 0.07% from other races, and 0.51% from two or more races.  0.53% of the population were Hispanic or Latino of any race.

There were 10,454 households, out of which 31.00% had children under the age of 18 living with them, 59.30% were married couples living together, 10.50% had a female householder with no husband present, and 26.30% were non-families. 24.40% of all households were made up of individuals, and 11.50% had someone living alone who was 65 years of age or older.  The average household size was 2.45 and the average family size was 2.89.

In the county, the population was spread out, with 22.40% under the age of 18, 8.70% from 18 to 24, 27.50% from 25 to 44, 27.40% from 45 to 64, and 13.90% who were 65 years of age or older.  The median age was 40 years. For every 100 females there were 96.90 males.  For every 100 females age 18 and over, there were 93.20 males.

The median income for a household in the county was $23,932, and the median income for a family was $29,709. Males had a median income of $32,493 versus $18,812 for females. The per capita income for the county was $14,220.  About 20.20% of families and 25.10% of the population were below the poverty line, including 36.90% of those under age 18 and 13.50% of those age 65 or over.

2010 census
As of the 2010 United States census, there were 23,796 people, 9,687 households, and 6,947 families living in the county. The racial makeup of the county was 98.2% white, 0.5% black or African American, 0.1% Asian, 0.1% American Indian, 0.1% from other races, and 1.0% from two or more races. Those of Hispanic or Latino origin made up 0.4% of the population. The largest ancestry groups were: 13.8% Irish, 13.2% English, 13.2% American, 12.6% German, 2.1% Italian, 1.2% Scotch-Irish, 1.2% Dutch, and 1.1% Scottish.

Of the 9,687 households, 30.8% had children under the age of 18 living with them, 56.3% were married couples living together, 10.3% had a female householder with no husband present, 28.3% were non-families, and 25.1% of all households were made up of individuals. The average household size was 2.45 and the average family size was 2.90. The median age was 42.6 years.

The median income for a household in the county was $36,343 and the median income for a family was $46,221. Males had a median income of $43,942 versus $26,428 for females. The per capita income for the county was $17,662. About 13.4% of families and 17.3% of the population were below the poverty line, including 24.4% of those under age 18 and 8.9% of those age 65 or over.

Politics

Communities

City
 Mullens

Towns
 Oceana
 Pineville (county seat)

Magisterial districts

Current
 District 1
 District 2
 District 3

Historic

 Baileysville
 Barkers Ridge
 Center
 Clear Fork
 Huff
 Oceana
 Slab Fork

Census-designated places

 Brenton
 Bud
 Corinne
 Covel
 Glen Fork
 Itmann
 Kopperston
 Matheny
 New Richmond

Unincorporated communities

 Allen Junction
 Alpoca
 Amigo
 Baileysville
 Beechwood
 Black Eagle
 Clear Fork
 Coal Mountain
 Cyclone
 Fanny
 Fanrock
 Garwood
 Glen Rogers
 Glover
 Hanover
 Herndon
 Ikes Fork
 Jesse
 Key Rock
 Lacoma
 Lynco
 Maben
 Marianna
 McGraws-Tipple
 Milam
 North Spring
 Otsego
 Pierpont
 Ravencliff
 Rock View
 Sabine
 Saulsville
 Simon
 Stephenson
 Tralee
 Windom
 Wolf Pen
 Wyco
 Wyoming

Notable people

 Bernie Casey, football player and actor
 Mike D'Antoni, NBA coach
 William C. Marland, West Virginia Governor
 Christy Martin,  professional boxer
 Jamie Noble, professional wrestler
 Joe Pendry, NFL coach
 Heath Slater, professional wrestler
 Curt Warner, football player
 Greg White, college basketball coach and motivational speaker

See also
 Horse Creek Wildlife Management Area
 National Register of Historic Places listings in Wyoming County West Virginia
 Twin Falls Resort State Park

Footnotes

References

External links
 Rural Appalachian Improvement League

 
1850 establishments in Virginia
Populated places established in 1850
Counties of Appalachia